Tregadgwith is a hamlet east of St Buryan, Cornwall, England, United Kingdom.

References

Hamlets in Cornwall